There are at least 314 named mountains in Flathead County, Montana.
 Adams Mountain, el. 
 Ahern Peak, el. 
 Akinkoka Peak, el. 
 Alcove Mountain, el. 
 Amphitheatre Mountain, el. 
 Anaconda Peak, el. 
 Angel Hill, el. 
 Antice Knob, el. 
 Argosy Mountain, el. 
 Arrowhead Mountain, el. 
 Ashley Mountain, el. 
 Bald Mountain, el. 
 Bald Mountain, el. 
 Bald Rock, el. 
 Baldhead Mountain, el. 
 Baldy Mountain, el. 
 Bar Z Peak, el. 
 Barrier Buttes, el. 
 Battery Mountain, el. 
 Battlement Mountain, el. 
 Beacon Mountain, el. 
 Bear Peak, el. 
 Bearhat Mountain, el. 
 Beaver Hill, el. 
 Belton Hills, el. 
 Belton Point, el. 
 Bent Mountain, el. 
 Big Bill Mountain, el. 
 Big Hawk Mountain, el. 
 Big Lodge Mountain, el. 
 Big Mountain, el. 
 Bighorn Mountain, el. 
 Bighorn Peak, el. 
 Black Bear Hump, el. 
 Black Bear Mountain, el. 
 Blackfoot Mountain, el. 
 Blacktail Hills, el. 
 Blacktail Mountain, el. 
 Blaine Mountain, el. 
 Bold Peak, el. 
 Boorman Peak, el. 
 Boulder Peak, el. 
 Bow Mountain, el. 
 Bowl Mountain, el. 
 Brave Dog Mountain, el. 
 Broken Leg Mountain, el. 
 Brownie Point, el. 
 Bruce Mountain, el. 
 Bungalow Mountain, el. 
 Bunker Hill, el. 
 Canyon Point, el. 
 Cap Mountain, el. 
 Caper Peak, el. 
 Capitol Mountain, el. 
 Castle Rock, el. 
 Cathedral Peak, el. 
 Center Mountain, el. 
 Chair Mountain, el. 
 Chipmunk Peak, el. 
 Church Butte, el. 
 Cinabar Mountain, el. 
 Circus Peak, el. 
 Clack Mountain, el. 
 Cleft Rock Mountain, el. 
 Clements Mountain, el. 
 Cliff Mountain, el. 
 Cloudcroft Peaks, el. 
 Columbia Mountain, el. 
 Condor Peak, el. 
 Cone Peak, el. 
 Crater Mountain, el. 
 Crossover Mountain, el. 
 Cruiser Mountain, el. 
 Cyclone Peak, el. 
 Desert Mountain, el. 
 Devils Hump, el. 
 Diamond Peak, el. 
 Dog Mountain, el. 
 Doris Mountain, el. 
 Double Mountain, el. 
 Dry Park Mountain, el. 
 Dunsire Point, el. 
 Eagle Ribs Mountain, el. 
 Eaglehead Mountain, el. 
 Edwards Mountain, el. 
 Elk Mountain, el. 
 Elk Mountain, el. 
 Emery Hill, el. 
 Essex Mountain, el. 
 Felix Peak, el. 
 Firefighter Mountain, el. 
 Flattop Mountain, el. 
 Forks Lookout, el. 
 Forster Mountain, el. 
 Fox Mountain, el. 
 Gable Peaks, el. 
 Gardner Point, el. 
 Garnet Peak, el. 
 Gateway Points, el. 
 Gildart Peak, el. 
 Glacier View Mountain, el. 
 Gladiator Mountain, el. 
 Great Bear Mountain, el. 
 Great Northern Mountain, el. 
 Green Mountain, el. 
 Grizzly Mountain, el. 
 Grouse Mountain, el. 
 Grubb Mountain, el. 
 Gunsight Mountain, el. 
 Gunsight Peak, el. 
 Gunsight Rock, el. 
 Hash Mountain, el. 
 Haskill Mountain, el. 
 Haystack Butte, el. 
 Heavens Peak, el. 
 Helen Mountain, el. 
 Helmet Point, el. 
 Hematite Peak, el. 
 Hornet Mountain, el. 
 Horseshoe Peak, el. 
 Huckleberry Mountain, el. 
 Hungry Horse Mountain, el. 
 Huntsberger Peak, el. 
 Ibex Mountain, el. 
 Ingalls Mountain, el. 
 Inspiration Point, el. 
 Java Mountain, el. 
 Johnson Peak, el. 
 Kah Mountain, el. 
 Keith Mountain, el. 
 Kerr Mountain, el. 
 Ketowke Mountain, el. 
 Kinnerly Peak, el. 
 Kintla Peak, el. 
 Lake Mountain, el. 
 Larch Hill, el. 
 Limestone Peak, el. 
 Lincoln Peak, el. 
 Link Mountain, el. 
 Lion Hill, el. 
 Lion Mountain, el. 
 Lion Mountain, el. 
 Little Dog Mountain, el. 
 Little Matterhorn, el. 
 Lodgepole Mountain, el. 
 Logging Mountain, el. 
 Lone Butte, el. 
 Lone Walker Mountain, el. 
 Loneman Mountain, el. 
 Long Knife Peak, el. 
 Longfellow Peak, el.

See also
 List of mountains in Montana
 List of mountain ranges in Montana

Notes

FlatheadA-L